Nanningia is a monotypic genus of Chinese long-jawed orb-weavers containing the single species, Nanningia zhangi. It was first described by M. S. Zhu, J. P. Kim & D. X. Song in 1997, and has only been found in China.

See also
 List of Tetragnathidae species

References

Monotypic Araneomorphae genera
Spiders of China
Tetragnathidae